Sinnakutty Odayar Canagaratnam (1880 – May 1938) was a Ceylon Tamil civil servant, politician and member of the State Council of Ceylon.

Early life and family
Canagaratnam was born in 1880. He was the son of Sinnakutty Odayar from Karaitivu in south-eastern Ceylon. He was educated at St. Andrew's English School, Batticaloa.

Canagaratnam was married to Muththamma, daughter of J. Abraham. They had four daughters - Daisy, Grace, Carmaline and Violet.

Career
Canagaratnam joined the Government Clerical Service and was later appointed Deputy Fiscal for Batticaloa District and Chief Mudaliyar for the Eastern Province. After retirement Canagaratnam contested the 1936 state council election as a candidate for the Batticaloa South seat and was elected to the State Council of Ceylon.

In 1921 Canagaratnam wrote a monograph, Monograph of the Batticaloa District of the Eastern Province, Ceylon. He died in May 1938.

Electoral history

References

1880 births
1938 deaths
Chief Mudaliyars
Members of the 2nd State Council of Ceylon
People from Eastern Province, Sri Lanka
People from British Ceylon
Sri Lankan Tamil civil servants
Sri Lankan Tamil politicians
Sri Lankan Tamil writers